Saleel Kulkarni (Marathi pronunciation: [saliːl kulkəɾɳiː]; 6 October 1972) is a Marathi music composer, singer and author.

Early life
Saleel Kulkarni sang the Marathi Prose 'Jayostute ' on All India Radio, Pune station at the age of three.  Thereafter, he undertook key lessons in singing and music from eminent personalities like Gangadharbuva Pimpalkhare, Jaymalabai Shiledar and Pramod Marathe. Formal education wise, Kulkarni is a medicine graduate and was working as a doctor in the early part of his.While working as a music director for the last ten years, he has composed songs for Hindi and Marathi albums, serials and films.

Musical associations
As a singer, Saleel Kulkarni has rendered his voice for many composers for albums and shows. Some of the artists that have sung/recorded for Kulkarni include Bela Shende, Shankar Mahadevan, Hariharan, Shreya Ghoshal, Sandeep Khare, Hrishikesh Ranade, Suvarna Mategaonkar, Shubha Joshi, Madhura Datar, Vibhavari Apte Joshi, Avadhoot Gupte. Saleel played Judge for competitive singing reality show "Sa Re Ga Ma Pa" on Zee Marathi where along with assessing the performances of participants, he mentored and nurtured many upcoming talented individuals. He has also written columns in leading Marathi daily. He is author of a maiden book "Lapavalelya Kaacha" 
Saleel runs a Music School in Pune.

Ayushyawar Bolu Kahi (आयुष्यावर बोलू काही) (Musical Program)
Saleel Kulkarni teamed up with Sandip Khare for the show 'Ayushyawar Bolu Kahi' (आयुष्यावर बोलू काही). Kulkarni was also a part of Marathi SaReGaMaPa as judge and mentor. He has performed in musical concerts in UK, US, Singapore, Switzerland, and Shanghai.

Maitra Jeevanche(Musical Program)
He is doing selected shows with veteran music director Hridaynath Mangeshkar for program 'Maitra Jeevanche' (मैत्र जीवांचे). After a long break of almost 12 years Lata Mangeshkar sang Marathi bhavgeeta when she recorded songs with him as a music director for the album "Kshan Amrutache".

Feature films
 Ek Unad Divas (Marathi)
 Jana Gana Mana
 Jameen (Marathi)
 Champion (Marathi)
 Ata Kashyala Udyachi Baat (Marathi)
 Dhaage Dore (Marathi)
 Chodo Kal Ki batein (Hindi)
 Nishani Dava Angatha (Marathi)
 Vitthal Vitthal (Marathi)
 Pandhar (Marathi)
 Chintoo (Marathi) 
 Chintoo 2 (Marathi)
 Chakwa  ( Marathi )
 Bandya Ani Baby  ( Marathi ) 
 Haay Kaay, Naay Kay  (Marathi ) 
 Anandi Anand  ( Marathi ) 
 Housefull ( Marathi )
 BIOSCOPE ( 4 SHORTFILMS )
 Monkey Baat ( Marathi )
 Wedding Cha Shinema ( Marathi )

Discography

Stage shows
 Ayushyawar Bolu Kahi (आयुष्यावर बोलू काही)
 Maitra Jeevanche (मैत्र जीवांचे) 
 Nakshatranche Dene (नक्षत्रांचे देणे)
 Tarihi Vasant Fulato (तरीही वसंत फुलतो)
 Gaani Manatali (गाणी मनातली)
 Dipadi Dipang (डीपाडी डिपांग)
 Maze Jagane Hote Gane (माझे जगणे होते गाणे)
 Bakibab Ani Mi (बाकीबाब आणि मी)

As author
In 2010, Saleel Kulkarni had written a fortnightly column 'Musically Yours' for leading Marathi daily Loksatta. The articles got finishing touch, got some literature treatment by author and came out as his maiden book 'Lapawlelya Kacha' (लपवलेल्या काचा). Owing to insistent demands from Marathi readers all over the world, publication house 'Continental' produced 3rd & 4th edition of book.
Released his second book ‘ Shahanya manasanchi factory ‘ in 2017 and is been very received by the readers.

As TV show compere
Saleel conceived and thematically designed the concept for weekly show 'Madhali Sutti' (मधली सुट्टी) being telecast on Zee Marathi.

As Director 
Saleel Kulkarni directed his maiden venture Wedding Cha Cinema, which released on 12 April 2019. Saleel has also written the story and screenplay for the movie.

Singles as Music Composer / Singer

Personal life
Kulkarni was married to National Award-winning singer Anjali Marathe, daughter of singer Anuradha Marathe. He has two children – son Shubhankar Kulkarni who sang in the movie Chintoo (चिंटू), as well as a daughter, Ananya. He later separated from Anjali Marathe.

References

Living people
Marathi people
Indian film score composers
Music directors
Musicians from Pune
Indian male playback singers
Marathi-language singers
Marathi playback singers
Indian male film score composers
1972 births